Greg Piatt (born June 29, 1962) is an American politician who served in the Oklahoma House of Representatives from the 48th district from 1998 to 2008.

References

1962 births
Living people
Republican Party members of the Oklahoma House of Representatives